Allen Lake may refer to:

Allen Lake (Minnesota)
Allen Lake (New York)